Grover Cleveland was president of the United States first from March 4, 1885, to March 4, 1889, and then from March 4, 1893, to March 4, 1897. The first Democrat elected after the Civil War, Cleveland is the only US president to leave office after one term and later return for a second term. His presidencies were the nation's 22nd and 24th. Cleveland defeated James G. Blaine of Maine in 1884, lost to Benjamin Harrison of Indiana in 1888, and then defeated President Harrison in 1892.

Cleveland won the 1884 election with the support of a reform-minded group of Republicans known as Mugwumps, and he expanded the number of government positions that were protected by the Pendleton Civil Service Reform Act. He also vetoed several bills designed to provide pensions and other benefits to various regions and individuals. In response to anti-competitive practices by railroads, Cleveland signed the Interstate Commerce Act of 1887, which established the first independent federal agency. During his first term, he unsuccessfully sought the repeal of the Bland–Allison Act and a lowering of the tariff. The Samoan crisis was the major foreign policy event of Cleveland's first term, and that crisis ended with a tripartite protectorate in the Samoan Islands.

As his second term began, disaster hit the nation when the Panic of 1893 produced a severe national depression. Cleveland presided over the repeal of the Sherman Silver Purchase Act, striking a blow against the Free Silver movement, and also lowered tariff rates by allowing the Wilson–Gorman Tariff Act to become law. He also ordered federal soldiers to crush the Pullman Strike. In foreign policy, Cleveland resisted the annexation of Hawaii and an American intervention in Cuba. He also sought to uphold the Monroe Doctrine and forced Great Britain to agree to arbitrate a border dispute with Venezuela. In the midterm elections of 1894, Cleveland's Democratic Party suffered a massive defeat that opened the way for the agrarian and silverite seizure of the Democratic Party.

The 1896 Democratic National Convention repudiated Cleveland and nominated silverite William Jennings Bryan, but Bryan was defeated by Republican William McKinley in the 1896 presidential election. Cleveland left office extremely unpopular, but his reputation was eventually rehabilitated in the 1930s by scholars led by Allan Nevins. More recent historians and biographers have taken a more ambivalent view of Cleveland, but many note Cleveland's role in re-asserting the power of the presidency. In rankings of American presidents by historians and political scientists, Cleveland is generally ranked as an average or above-average president.

Election of 1884

Cleveland had risen to prominence as an advocate of civil service reform, and he was widely viewed as a presidential contender after his victory in the 1882 New York gubernatorial election. Samuel J. Tilden, the party's nominee in 1876, was the initial front-runner, but he declined to run due to poor health. Cleveland, Thomas F. Bayard of Delaware, Allen G. Thurman of Ohio, Samuel Freeman Miller of Iowa, and Benjamin Butler of Massachusetts each had considerable followings entering the 1884 Democratic National Convention. Each of the other candidates had hindrances to his nomination: Bayard had spoken in favor of secession in 1861, making him unacceptable to Northerners; Butler, conversely, was reviled throughout the South for his actions during the Civil War; Thurman was generally well liked, but was growing old and infirm, and his views on the silver question were uncertain.

Cleveland, too, had detractors—the Tammany Hall political machine opposed him—but the nature of his enemies made him still more friends. He also benefited from the backing of state party leader Daniel Manning, who positioned Cleveland as the natural heir to Tilden and emphasized the importance of New York's electoral votes in any Democratic presidential victory. Cleveland led on the convention's first ballot and clinched the nomination on the second ballot. Thomas A. Hendricks of Indiana was selected as his running mate. The 1884 Republican National Convention nominated former Speaker of the House James G. Blaine of Maine for president; Blaine's nomination alienated many Republicans who viewed Blaine as ambitious and immoral.

Blaine campaigned on implementing a protective tariff, increasing international trade, and investing in infrastructure projects, while the Democratic campaign focused on Blaine's ethics. In general, Cleveland abided by the precedent of minimizing presidential campaign travel and speechmaking; Blaine became one of the first to break with that tradition. Corruption in politics became the central issue in 1884, and Blaine had over the span of his career been involved in several questionable deals. Cleveland's reputation as an opponent of corruption proved the Democrats' strongest asset. Reform-minded Republicans called "Mugwumps", including men such as Carl Schurz and Henry Ward Beecher, denounced Blaine as corrupt and flocked to Cleveland. At the same time the Democrats gained support from the Mugwumps, they lost some blue-collar workers to the Greenback-Labor party, led by Benjamin Butler.

As expected, Cleveland carried the Solid South, while Blaine carried most of New England and the Midwest. The electoral votes of closely contested New York, New Jersey, Indiana, and Connecticut determined the election. After the votes were counted, Cleveland narrowly won all four of the swing states; he won his home state of New York by a margin of 0.1%, which amounted to just 1200 votes. Cleveland won the nationwide popular vote by one-quarter of a percent, while he won the electoral vote by a majority of 219–182. Cleveland's victory made him the first successful Democratic presidential nominee since the start of the Civil War. Despite Cleveland's successful candidacy, Republicans retained control of the Senate.

First presidency (1885–1889)

Cleveland was sworn into office as the 22nd president of the United States on March 4, 1885. That same day, Hendricks was sworn in as vice president. Hendricks died  days into this term, and the office remained vacant since there was no constitutional provision at the time for filling an intra-term vice-presidential vacancy.

Administration

Appointments

There was much speculation during the presidential transition period about who would be serving in Cleveland's cabinet. It was generally assumed that Thomas F. Bayard would be offered the position of secretary of state. By February 27, 1885, Cleveland had been reported to have settled on all the officeholders for his Cabinet. However, Daniel S. Lamont, Cleveland's private secretary, immediately denied reports that Cleveland had settled upon his Cabinet choices, and that he had announced his selections to others.

Cleveland faced the challenge of putting together the first Democratic cabinet since the 1850s, and none of the individuals that he appointed to his cabinet had served in the cabinet of another administration. Senator Bayard, Cleveland's strongest rival for the 1884 nomination, accepted the position of Secretary of State. Daniel Manning, a key New York adviser for Cleveland as well as a close ally of Samuel Tilden, became the Secretary of the Treasury. Another New Yorker, the prominent financier William C. Whitney, was appointed Secretary of the Navy. For the position of Secretary of War, Cleveland appointed William C. Endicott, a prominent Massachusetts judge with ties to the Mugwumps. Cleveland chose two Southerners for his cabinet: Lucius Q. C. Lamar of Mississippi as Secretary of the Interior, and Augustus H. Garland of Arkansas as Attorney General. Postmaster General William F. Vilas of Wisconsin was the lone Westerner in the cabinet. Daniel S. Lamont served as Cleveland's private secretary, becoming one of the most important individuals in the administration.

Marriage and children

Cleveland entered the White House as a bachelor, and his sister Rose Cleveland acted as hostess for the first two years of his administration. On June 2, 1886, Cleveland married Frances Folsom in the Blue Room at the White House. Though Cleveland had supervised Frances's upbringing after her father's death, the public took no exception to the match. At 21 years, Frances Folsom Cleveland was the youngest First Lady in history, and the public soon warmed to her beauty and warm personality.

Reforms and civil service

Presidential appointments until now were typically filled under the spoils system. However Cleveland announced that he would not fire any Republican who was doing his job well, and would not appoint anyone solely on the basis of party service. Later in his term, as his fellow Democrats chafed at being excluded from the patronage, Cleveland began to replace more of the partisan Republican officeholders with Democrats; this was especially the case with policy-making positions. While some of his decisions were influenced by party concerns, more of Cleveland's appointments were decided by merit alone than was the case in his predecessors' administrations. During his first term, Cleveland also expanded the number of federal positions subject to the merit system (under the terms of the recently passed Pendleton Civil Service Reform Act) from 16,000 to 27,000. Due to Cleveland's and Harrison's efforts, between 1885 and 1897, the percentage of federal employees protected by the Pendleton Act rose from twelve percent to forty percent. Nonetheless, many Mugwumps were disappointed by Cleveland's unwillingness to promote a truly nonpartisan civil service.

Cleveland was the first Democratic president subject to the Tenure of Office Act, which originated in 1867; the act purported to require the Senate to approve the dismissal of any presidential appointee who was originally subject to its advice and consent. Cleveland resisted the Senate's attempts to enforce the act, and invoked executive privilege in refusing to hand over documents related to appointments. Despite criticism from reformers like Carl Schurz, Cleveland's stance proved popular with the public. Republican Senator George Frisbie Hoar proposed a bill to repeal the Tenure of Office Act, and Cleveland signed the repeal into law in March 1887.

In 1889, Cleveland signed into law a bill that elevated the Department of Agriculture to the cabinet level, and Norman Jay Coleman became the first United States Secretary of Agriculture. Cleveland angered railroad investors by ordering an investigation of Western lands they held by government grant. Secretary of the Interior Lamar charged that the rights of way for this land must be returned to the public because the railroads failed to extend their lines according to agreements.

Interstate Commerce Act

During the 1880s, public support for the regulation of railroads grew because of anger over anti-competitive railroad practices such as "discrimination," in which the railroads charged different rates to different clients. Though often critical of the business practices of railroad magnates like Jay Gould, Cleveland was generally reluctant to involve the federal government in regulatory matters. Despite this reluctance, after the Supreme Court's holding in the 1886 case of Wabash, St. Louis & Pacific Railway Co. v. Illinois severely limited the power of states to regulate interstate commerce, Cleveland assented to legislation providing for federal oversight of railroads. In 1887, he signed the Interstate Commerce Act of 1887, which created the Interstate Commerce Commission (ICC), a five-member commission tasked with investigating railroad practices. The ICC was charged with helping to ensure that the railroads charged fair rates, but the power to determine whether rates were fair was assigned to the courts. In addition to creating the ICC, the Interstate Commerce Act of 1887 required railroads to publicly post rates and made the practice of railroad pooling illegal. The act was the first federal law to regulate private industry in the United States, and the ICC was the first independent agency of the federal government. The Interstate Commerce Act had only a modest effect on railroad practices, as talented railroad lawyers and a conservative judiciary limited the impact of the various provisions of the law.

Vetoes

Cleveland used the veto far more often than any president up to that time. He vetoed hundreds of private pension bills for Civil War veterans, believing that if their pensions requests had already been rejected by the Pension Bureau, Congress should not attempt to override that decision. When Congress, pressured by the Grand Army of the Republic, passed a bill granting pensions for disabilities not caused by military service, Cleveland also vetoed that. In 1887, Cleveland issued his most well-known veto, of the Texas Seed Bill. A severe drought had devastated many in Texas, with some numbers suggesting that 85% of cattle died in the western part of the state. Many farmers themselves were on the brink of starvation as a result of the crisis. Congress, in response, appropriated $10,000 to purchase seed grain for farmers there. Cleveland vetoed the expenditure. In his veto message, he espoused a theory of limited government:

Monetary policy

One of the most volatile issues of the 1880s was whether the currency should be backed by gold and silver, or by gold alone. The issue cut across party lines, with Western Republicans and Southern Democrats joining in the call for the free coinage of silver, and both parties' representatives in the Northeast favoring the gold standard. Because silver was worth less than its legal equivalent in gold, taxpayers paid their government bills in silver, while international creditors demanded payment in gold, resulting in a depletion of the nation's gold supply. Bimetallism tended to result in inflation, which in turn made it easier for debtors to pay off their loans and increased agricultural prices. It was thus popular in many agrarian states.

Cleveland saw monetary policy as both an economic and moral issue; he thought that adherence to the gold standard would ensure a stable currency, and also felt that those who had extended loans should not be penalized by rising inflation. Cleveland and Treasury Secretary Manning tried to reduce the amount of silver that the government was required to coin under the Bland–Allison Act of 1878. Cleveland also unsuccessfully appealed to Congress to repeal this law before he was inaugurated. In reply, one of the foremost silverites, Richard P. Bland, introduced a bill in 1886 that would require the government to coin unlimited amounts of silver, inflating the then-deflating currency. While Bland's bill was defeated, so was a bill the administration favored that would repeal any silver coinage requirement. The result was a retention of the status quo, and a postponement of the resolution of the Free Silver issue.

Tariffs

American tariff rates had increased dramatically during the Civil War, and by the 1880s the tariff brought in so much revenue that the government was running a surplus. Cleveland had not campaigned on the tariff in the 1884 election, but his cabinet, like most Democrats, were sympathetic to calls for lower tariffs. Cleveland's opposition to protective tariffs was rooted in his belief that they unfairly benefited certain industries, and unfairly taxed consumers, by raising prices. Republicans, by contrast, generally favored a high tariff to protect American industries from foreign competitors. Cleveland recommended a reduction of the tariff as part of his first two annual messages to Congress, and he devoted the entirety of his 1887 annual message to tariff reduction. Cleveland warned that the budget surpluses caused by the high tariffs would lead to a financial crisis.

Despite Cleveland's advocacy, no major tariff bill passed during Cleveland's first presidency. In 1886, a bill to reduce the tariff was narrowly defeated in the House. Republicans, as well as protectionist Northern Democrats like Samuel J. Randall, believed that American industries would fail absent high tariffs, and continued to fight efforts to lower tariffs. Roger Q. Mills, chairman of the House Ways and Means Committee, proposed a bill to reduce the tariff from about 47% to about 40%. After significant exertions by Cleveland and his allies, the bill passed the House. Senate Republicans countered by introducing the Blair Education Bill, which would have granted federal educational aid to states based on illiteracy rates. The bill passed the Senate with the support of many Southern Democrats, whose constituents benefited disproportionately from the bill. The Senate refused to pass the Mills Tariff, while the House refused to pass the Blair Education Bill. Debate over the tariff persisted into the 1888 presidential election.

Foreign policy, 1885–1889

Cleveland was a committed non-interventionist who had campaigned in opposition to expansion and imperialism. He refused to support the Frelinghuysen-Zavala Treaty, negotiated by the lame duck Arthur Administration, which would have allowed the United States to built a canal in Nicaragua connecting the Atlantic Ocean and the Pacific Ocean. He did, however, see the Monroe Doctrine as an important plank of foreign policy, and he sought to protect American hegemony in the Western Hemisphere. Secretary of State Bayard negotiated with Joseph Chamberlain of Great Briain over fishing rights in the waters off Canada, and struck a conciliatory note, despite the opposition of New England's Republican senators. Cleveland also withdrew from Senate consideration the Berlin Conference treaty which guaranteed an open door for U.S. interests in the Congo.

Cleveland's presidency saw the start of the Samoan crisis between the U.S., Germany, and Great Britain. Each of those nations had signed a treaty with Samoa under which they were allowed to engage in trade and maintain a naval base, but Cleveland feared that the Germans sought to annex Samoa after the Germans attempted to remove Malietoa Laupepa as the monarch of Samoa in favor of Tuiātua Tupua Tamasese Titimaea. The U.S. encouraged another claimant to the throne, Mata'afa Iosefo, to rebel against Malietoa, and in doing so Mata'afa's forces killed a contingent of German naval guards. German Chancellor Otto Von Bismarck threatened a retaliatory war, but Germany backed down in the face of American and British resistance. In a subsequent conference that took place shortly after Cleveland left office, the United States, Germany, and Britain agreed to make Samoa a joint protectorate.

Military policy, 1885–1889

Cleveland's military policy emphasized self-defense and modernization. In 1885 Cleveland established the Board of Fortifications under Secretary of War Endicott to recommend a new coastal fortification system for the United States. No improvements to U.S. coastal defenses had been made since the late 1870s. The board's 1886 report recommended a massive $127 million construction program at 29 harbors and river estuaries, to include new breech-loading rifled guns, mortars, and naval minefields. Most of the board's recommendations were implemented, and by 1910, 27 locations were defended by over 70 forts.

Secretary of the Navy Whitney promoted the modernization of the Navy, although no ships were constructed that could match the best European warships. Construction of four steel-hulled warships that had begun under the Arthur administration was delayed due to a corruption investigation and subsequent bankruptcy of their building yard, but these ships were completed in a timely manner once the investigation was over. Eleven protected cruisers (including ), one armored cruiser, and one monitor were also ordered, along with the experimental cruiser .

Civil rights and immigration

Cleveland, like a growing number of Northerners (and nearly all white Southerners), believed that Reconstruction had been a failed experiment. He was unwilling to use federal power to enforce the Fifteenth Amendment, which guaranteed voting rights to African-Americans. Though Cleveland appointed no black Americans to patronage jobs, he allowed Frederick Douglass to continue in his post as recorder of deeds in Washington, D.C. and appointed another black man to replace Douglass upon his resignation.

Cleveland generally did not embrace nativism or immigration restrictions, but he believed that the purpose of immigration was to attract immigrants who would assimilate into American society. Early in his tenure, Cleveland condemned "outrages" against Chinese immigrants, but he eventually came to believe that the deep animosity towards Chinese immigrants in the United States would prevent their assimilation. Secretary of State Bayard negotiated an extension to the Chinese Exclusion Act, and Cleveland lobbied the Congress to pass the Scott Act, written by Congressman William Lawrence Scott, which prevented the return of Chinese immigrants who left the United States. The Scott Act easily passed both houses of Congress, and Cleveland signed it into law in October 1888.

Indian policy
Approximately 250,000 Native Americans lived in the United States when Cleveland took office, a dramatic decline from previous decades. Cleveland viewed Native Americans as wards of the state, saying in his first inaugural address that "[t]his guardianship involves, on our part, efforts for the improvement of their condition and enforcement of their rights." Cleveland encouraged the idea of cultural assimilation, pushing for the passage of the Dawes Act, which provided for distribution of Indian lands to individual members of tribes, rather than having them continued to be held in trust for the tribes by the federal government. While a conference of Native leaders endorsed the act, in practice the majority of Native Americans disapproved of it. Cleveland believed the Dawes Act would lift Native Americans out of poverty and encourage their assimilation into white society, but it ultimately weakened the tribal governments because it allowed individual Indians to sell tribal land and keep the money for themselves. Between 1881 and 1900, the total land held by Native Americans fell from 155 million acres to 77 million acres.

In the month before Cleveland's 1885 inauguration, President Arthur opened four million acres of Winnebago and Crow Creek Indian lands in the Dakota Territory to white settlement by executive order. Tens of thousands of settlers gathered at the border of these lands and prepared to take possession of them. Cleveland believed Arthur's order to be in violation of treaties with the tribes, and rescinded it on April 17 of that year, ordering the settlers out of the territory. Cleveland sent in eighteen companies of Army troops to enforce the treaties and ordered General Philip Sheridan, at the time Commanding General of the U.S. Army, to investigate the matter.

Judicial appointments

During his first term, Cleveland successfully nominated two justices to the Supreme Court of the United States. After Associate Justice William Burnham Woods died, Cleveland nominated Interior Secretary Lucius Q.C. Lamar to the Supreme Court in late 1887. While Lamar had been well-liked as a Senator, his service under the Confederacy two decades earlier caused many Republicans to vote against him. Lamar's nomination was confirmed by the narrow margin of 32 to 28.

Chief Justice Morrison Waite died in March 1888, and Cleveland nominated Melville Fuller to fill his seat. Though Fuller had previously declined Cleveland's nomination to the Civil Service Commission, he accepted the nomination to the Supreme Court. The Senate Judiciary Committee spent several months examining the little-known nominee, before the Senate confirmed the nomination 41 to 20. Fuller served as Chief Justice until 1910, presiding over a court that inaugurated the Lochner era.

Election of 1888

With little opposition, Cleveland won re-nomination at the 1888 Democratic National Convention, making him the first Democratic president to win re-nomination since Martin Van Buren in 1840. Vice President Hendricks having died in 1885, the Democrats chose Allen G. Thurman of Ohio to be Cleveland's new running mate. Former Senator Benjamin Harrison of Indiana defeated John Sherman and several other candidates to win the presidential nomination of the 1888 Republican National Convention. The Republicans campaigned heavily on the tariff issue, turning out protectionist voters in the important industrial states of the North. Democrats in the crucial swing state of New York were divided over the gubernatorial candidacy of David B. Hill, weakening Cleveland's support. The Republicans gained the upper hand in the campaign, as Cleveland's campaign was poorly managed by Calvin S. Brice and William H. Barnum, whereas Harrison had engaged more aggressive fundraisers and tacticians in Matt Quay and John Wanamaker. The Cleveland campaign was further damaged by the desertion of many Mugwumps, who were disappointed by the lack of far-reaching civil service reforms.

As in 1884, the election focused on the swing states of New York, New Jersey, Connecticut, and Indiana. Cleveland won every state he had carried in 1884 except for Indiana and his home state of New York, both of which were narrowly won by Harrison. Though Cleveland won the nationwide popular vote by a margin of 0.8%, the loss of his home state's 36 electoral votes denied him re-election. Republicans also won control of the House of Representatives, giving the party control of both houses of Congress for the first time since 1875. Cleveland's loss made him the first incumbent president since Van Buren to be defeated in the general election.

Election of 1892

After his loss in the 1888 election, Cleveland returned to New York, where he resumed his legal career. Cleveland established himself as a contender for the 1892 nomination with his February 1891 "Silver Letter," in which he deplored the rising strength of the Free Silver movement in the Democratic Party. Cleveland's chief opponent for the nomination was David B. Hill, now a Senator for New York. Hill united the anti-Cleveland elements of the Democratic party—silverites, protectionists, and Tammany Hall—but was unable to create a coalition large enough to deny Cleveland the nomination, and Cleveland was nominated on the first ballot of the convention. For vice president, the Democrats chose to balance the ticket with Adlai Stevenson I of Illinois, a silverite. Although the Cleveland forces preferred Isaac P. Gray of Indiana for vice president, they accepted the convention favorite. As a supporter of greenbacks and Free Silver to inflate the currency and alleviate economic distress in the rural districts, Stevenson balanced the otherwise hard-money, gold-standard ticket headed by Cleveland. The Republicans re-nominated President Harrison, making the 1892 election a rematch of the one four years earlier.

The issue of the tariff worked to the Republicans' advantage in 1888, but the legislative revisions of the past four years had made imported goods so expensive that many voters favored tariff reform and were skeptical of big business. Many Westerners, traditionally Republican voters, defected to James Weaver, the candidate of the new Populist Party. Weaver promised Free Silver, generous veterans' pensions, and an eight-hour work day. At the campaign's end, many Populists and labor supporters endorsed Cleveland after an attempt by the Carnegie Corporation to break the union during the Homestead Strike in Pittsburgh and after a similar conflict between big business and labor at the Tennessee Coal and Iron Co. The Tammany Hall Democrats, meanwhile, adhered to the national ticket, allowing a united Democratic Party to carry New York.

Cleveland won 46% of the popular vote and 62.4% of the electoral vote, becoming the first (and so far only) person to win non-consecutive presidential terms. Harrison won 43% of the popular vote and 32.7% of the electoral vote, while Weaver won 8.5% of the popular vote and the votes of several presidential electors from Western states. Cleveland swept the Solid South, won the swing states of New York, New Jersey, Indiana, and Connecticut, and surprised many observers by also taking Illinois, Wisconsin, and Indiana. In the concurrent congressional elections, Democrats retained control of the House and won control of the Senate, giving the party unified control of Congress and the presidency for the first time since the Civil War. Cleveland's victory made him the second individual to win the popular vote in three presidential elections, alongside Andrew Jackson.

Second presidency (1893–1897)

Cleveland was sworn into office as the 24th president of the United States on March 4, 1893. That same day, Stevenson was sworn in as vice president.

Administration

Appointments

In assembling his second cabinet, Cleveland avoided re-appointing the cabinet members of his first term. Two long-time Cleveland loyalists, Daniel S. Lamont and Wilson S. Bissell, joined the cabinet as Secretary of War and Postmaster General, respectively. Walter Q. Gresham, a former Republican who had served in President Arthur's cabinet, became Secretary of State. Richard Olney of Massachusetts was appointed as Attorney General, and he succeeded Gresham as Secretary of State after the latter's death. Former Speaker of the House John G. Carlisle of Kentucky became the Secretary of the Treasury.

Cancer
In 1893, Cleveland underwent oral surgery to remove a tumor. Cleveland decided to have surgery secretly, to avoid further panic that might worsen the financial depression. The surgery occurred on July 1, to give Cleveland time to make a full recovery in time for the upcoming Congressional session. The surgeons operated aboard the Oneida, a yacht owned by Cleveland's friend E. C. Benedict, as it sailed off Long Island. The surgery was conducted through the president's mouth, to avoid any scars or other signs of surgery. The size of the tumor and the extent of the operation left Cleveland's mouth disfigured. During another surgery, Cleveland was fitted with a hard rubber dental prosthesis that corrected his speech and restored his appearance. A cover story about the removal of two bad teeth kept the suspicious press placated. Cleveland's operation would not be revealed to the public until 1917.

Economic panic and the silver issue

Shortly after Cleveland's second term began, the Panic of 1893 struck the stock market, and the Cleveland administration faced an acute economic depression. The panic was sparked by the collapse of the overleveraged Philadelphia and Reading Railroad, but several underlying issues contributed to the start of a severe economic crisis. European credit played a major role in the U.S. economy during the Gilded Age, and European investors often infused cash into the economy. However, international investor confidence had been damaged by a financial crisis in Argentina, which had nearly caused the collapse of the London-based Barings Bank. Combined with poor economic conditions in Europe, the Argentinian financial crisis led many European investors to liquidate their American investments. Further exacerbating the economy was the poor cotton crop in the U.S. in 1892, as the export of cotton often infused the U.S. economy with European cash and credit. These factors combined to leave the U.S. financial system with insufficient financial resources, and, as the U.S. lacked a central banking system, the federal government had little control over the money supply. 

One of the first clear signs of financial crisis came on February 20, 1893, twelve days prior to Cleveland's inauguration, when receivers were appointed for the Philadelphia and Reading Railroad, which had greatly overextended itself. President Harrison and United States Secretary of the Treasury Charles Foster ignored the urging of individuals such as J.P. Morgan to take steps to reassure investors. Instead, Harrison reassured Congress that there was no cause for concern. Thus the crisis was laid at Cleveland's feet. Republicans would ultimately go on to subsequently blame Cleveland for causing the economic downturn that he had, in actuality, inherited from the Republican Harrison.

As panic spread following the collapse of the Philadelphia and Reading Railroad, a May 1893 bank run throughout the nation left the financial system with even less resources. Cleveland believed that bimetallism encouraged the hoarding of gold and discouraged investment from European financiers. He argued that adopting the gold standard would alleviate the economic crisis by providing a hard currency. Seeking to repeal the Sherman Silver Purchase Act and end the coinage of silver-based currency, Cleveland called a special session of Congress, to begin in August 1893. The silverites rallied their following at a convention in Chicago, and the House of Representatives debated for fifteen weeks before passing the repeal by a considerable margin. In the Senate, the repeal of silver coinage was equally contentious. Cleveland, forced against his better judgment to lobby the Congress for repeal, cajoled several Senate Democrats to support repeal. Many Senate Democrats favored a middle course between the silverites and Cleveland, but Cleveland squashed their attempts to produce a compromise bill. A combination of Democrats and eastern Republicans ultimately supported the repeal of the Sherman Silver Purchase Act, and the repeal bill passed the Senate by a 48–37 majority. Depletion of the Treasury's gold reserves continued, at a lesser rate, but subsequent bond issues replenished supplies of gold. At the time the repeal seemed a minor setback to silverites, but it marked the beginning of the end of silver as a basis for American currency.

Contrary to the administration's claims during the debate over the repeal bill, the repeal failed to restore investor confidence. Hundreds of banks and other businesses failed, and 25 percent of the nation's railroads were in receivership by 1895. Unemployment rates rose above 20 percent in much of the country, while those who were able to remain employed experienced significant wage cuts. The economic panic also caused a drastic reduction in government revenue. In 1894, with the government in danger of being unable to meet its expenditures, Cleveland convinced a group led by financier J. P. Morgan to purchase sixty million dollars in U.S. bonds. The deal resulted in an infusion of gold into the economy, allowing for the continuation of the gold standard, but Cleveland was widely criticized for relying on Wall Street bankers to keep the government running. Poor economic conditions persisted throughout Cleveland's second term, and unemployment levels rose in late 1895 and 1896.

Labor unrest

Coxey's Army

The Panic of 1893 damaged labor conditions across the United States, and the victory of anti-silver legislation worsened the mood of western laborers. A group of workingmen led by Jacob S. Coxey began to march east toward Washington, D.C. to protest Cleveland's policies. This group, known as Coxey's Army, agitated in favor of a national roadbuilding program to give jobs to workingmen, and a bimetallist currency to help farmers pay their debts. The march began with just 122 participants, but, in a sign of its national prominence, was covered by 44 assigned reporters. Numerous individuals joined Coxey's Army along its route, and many who sought to join the march hijacked railroads. Upon arriving in Washington, the marchers were dispersed by the U.S. Army and then prosecuted for demonstrating in front of the United States Capitol. Coxey himself returned to Ohio to unsuccessfully run for Congress as a member of the Populist Party in the 1894 elections. Though Coxey's Army did not present a serious threat to the government, it signaled a growing dissatisfaction in the West with Eastern monetary policies.

Pullman Strike

As railroads suffered from declining profits, they cut wages to workers; by April 1894, the average railroad worker's pay had declined by over 25 percent since the start of 1893. Led by Eugene V. Debs, the American Railway Union (ARU) organized strikes against the Northern Pacific Railway and the Union Pacific Railroad. The strikes soon spread to other industries, including the Pullman Company. After George Pullman refused to negotiate with the ARU and laid off workers involved with the union, the ARU refused to service any railroad car constructed by the Pullman Company, beginning the Pullman Strike. By June 1894, 125,000 railroad workers were on strike, paralyzing the nation's commerce. Because the railroads carried the mail, and because several of the affected lines were in federal receivership, Cleveland believed a federal solution was appropriate. He was urged to act by Attorney General Olney, a former railroad attorney who worked with railroad interests to destroy the ARU.

Cleveland obtained an injunction in federal court, and when the strikers refused to obey it, he sent federal troops into Chicago and 20 other rail centers. "If it takes the entire army and navy of the United States to deliver a postcard in Chicago", he proclaimed, "that card will be delivered." Governor John P. Altgeld of Illinois angrily protested Cleveland's deployment of troops, arguing that Cleveland had usurped the police power of state governments. Though Rutherford B. Hayes had set a precedent for using federal soldiers in labor disputes, Cleveland was the first president to deploy soldiers in a labor dispute without the invitation of a state governor. Leading newspapers of both parties applauded Cleveland's actions, but the use of troops hardened the attitude of organized labor toward his administration. Cleveland's actions would be upheld by the Supreme Court in the case of In re Debs, which sanctioned the president's right to intervene in labor disputes that affected interstate commerce. The outcome of the Pullman Strike, combined with the administration's weak anti-trust prosecution against the American Sugar Refining Company, made many believe that Cleveland was a tool of big business.

Tariff frustrations

The McKinley Tariff was the centerpiece of Republican policy, but Democrats attacked it for raising consumer prices. Democrats believed their victory in the 1892 election gave them a mandate to lower tariff rates, and Democratic leaders made tariff reduction a key priority after Congress repealed the Sherman Silver Act. West Virginian Representative William L. Wilson introduced a tariff reduction bill, co-written with Cleveland administration, in December 1893. The bill proposed moderate downward revisions in the tariff, especially on raw materials. The shortfall in revenue was to be made up by an income tax of two percent on income above $4,000, equivalent to $ today. Corporate profits, gifts, and inheritances would also be taxed at a two percent rate. The bill would restore the federal income tax for the first time since the 1870s; supporters of the income tax believed that it would help reduce income inequality and shift the burden of taxation to the wealthy. Wilson and the Cleveland administration were ambivalent about the income tax, but it was included in the bill due to the efforts of Congressmen William Jennings Bryan and Benton McMillin. After lengthy debate, the bill passed the House by a considerable margin.

The bill was next considered in the Senate, where it faced stronger opposition from key Democrats led by Arthur Pue Gorman of Maryland, who insisted on more protection for their states' industries than the Wilson bill allowed. The bill passed the Senate with more than 600 amendments attached that nullified most of the reforms. The Sugar Trust in particular lobbied for changes that favored it at the expense of the consumer. Despite strong conservative opposition to the income tax, it remained in the bill, partly because many senators believed that the Supreme Court would eventually declare the tax to be unconstitutional. After extensive debate, the Senate passed the Wilson–Gorman tariff bill in July 1894 in a 39-to-34 vote. Wilson and Cleveland attempted to restore some of lower rates of the original House bill, but the House voted to enact the Senate version of the bill in August 1894. The final bill lowered average tariff rates from 49 percent to 42 percent. Cleveland was outraged with the final bill and denounced it as a disgraceful product of the control of the Senate by trusts and business interests. His main issue was thus ruined.  Even so, he believed that the Wilson–Gorman Tariff Act was an improvement over the McKinley tariff and allowed it to become law without his signature. The personal income tax included in the tariff was struck down by the Supreme Court in the 1895 case, Pollock v. Farmers' Loan & Trust Co.

Civil rights

In 1892, Cleveland had campaigned against the Lodge Bill, which would have strengthened voting rights protections through the appointing of federal supervisors of congressional elections upon a petition from the citizens of any district. Once in office, he continued to oppose any federal effort to protect voting rights. The Enforcement Act of 1871 provided for a detailed federal overseeing of the electoral process, from registration to the certification of returns, but in 1894 Cleveland signed a repeal of this law. Cleveland approved of the 1896 Supreme Court decision of Plessy v. Ferguson, which recognized the constitutionality of racial segregation under the "separate but equal" doctrine. With the Supreme Court and the federal government both unwilling to intervene to protect the suffrage of African-Americans, Southern states continued to pass numerous Jim Crow laws, effectively denying suffrage to many African Americans through a combination of poll taxes, literacy and comprehension tests, and residency and record-keeping requirements.

1894 elections

Just before the 1894 election, Cleveland was warned by Francis Lynde Stetson, an advisor:

We are on the eve of [a] very dark night, unless a return of commercial prosperity relieves popular discontent with what they believe [is] Democratic incompetence to make laws, and consequently [discontent] with Democratic Administrations anywhere and everywhere.

The warning was appropriate, for in the Congressional elections, Republicans won their biggest landslide in decades, taking full control of the House. Democrats experienced losses everywhere outside of the South, where the party fended off the Populist challenge to their dominance. The Populists increased their share of the national vote but lost control of Western states such as Kansas and Colorado to the Republicans. Cleveland's factional enemies gained control of the Democratic Party in state after state, including full control in Illinois and Michigan, and made major gains in Ohio, Indiana, Iowa and other states. Wisconsin and Massachusetts were two of the few states that remained under the control of Cleveland's allies. The Democratic opposition were close to controlling two-thirds of the vote at the 1896 national convention, which they needed to nominate their own candidate. For the last two years of his term, Cleveland faced a Republican-controlled Congress, and the remaining Democrats in Congress consisted largely of agrarian-oriented Southerners who held little allegiance to Cleveland.

Foreign policy, 1893–1897

When Cleveland re-entered office he faced the question of Hawaiian annexation. In his first term, he had supported free trade with Hawai'i and accepted an amendment that gave the United States a coaling and naval station in Pearl Harbor. In the intervening four years, Honolulu businessmen of European and American ancestry had denounced Queen Liliuokalani as a tyrant who rejected constitutional government. In early 1893 they engineered the overthrow of the monarchy, set up a republic under Sanford B. Dole, and sought to join the United States. The Harrison administration quickly agreed with representatives of the new government on a treaty of annexation, which was submitted it to the Senate for ratification on February 15, 1893. On March 9, five days after taking office, Cleveland withdrew the treaty from the Senate. His biographer Alyn Brodsky argues it was a deeply personal opposition on Cleveland's part to what he saw as an immoral action against a little kingdom:
Just as he stood up for the Samoan Islands against Germany because he opposed the conquest of a lesser state by a greater one, so did he stand up for the Hawaiian Islands against his own nation. He could have let the annexation of Hawaii move inexorably to its inevitable culmination. But he opted for confrontation, which he hated, as it was to him the only way a weak and defenseless people might retain their independence. It was not the idea of annexation that Grover Cleveland opposed, but the idea of annexation as a pretext for illicit territorial acquisition.

Cleveland sent former Congressman James Henderson Blount to Hawai'i to investigate the conditions there. Blount, a leader in the white supremacy movement in Georgia, had long denounced imperialism. Some observers speculated he would support annexation on grounds of the inability of Asiatics to govern themselves. Instead, Blount proposed that the U.S. military restore the Queen by force and argued that the Hawaiian natives should be allowed to continue their "Asiatic ways." Cleveland decided to restore the queen, but she refused to grant amnesty as a condition of her reinstatement, saying that she would either execute or banish the current government in Honolulu, and seize all of their properties. Dole's government refused to yield their position, and few Americans wanted to use armed force to overthrow a republican government in order to install an absolute monarch. In December 1893, Cleveland referred the issue to Congress; he encouraged the continuation of the American tradition of non-intervention. Dole had more support in Congress than the queen. Republicans warned that a completely independent Hawaii could not long survive the scramble for colonies. Most observers thought Japan would soon take it over, and indeed the population of Hawaii was already over 20 percent Japanese. The Japanese advance was worrisome especially on the West Coast. The Senate, under Democratic control but opposed to Cleveland, commissioned the Morgan Report, which contradicted Blount's findings and found the overthrow was a completely internal affair. Cleveland dropped all talk of reinstating the queen, and went on to recognize and maintain diplomatic relations with the new Republic of Hawaii. In 1898, after Cleveland left office, the United States annexed Hawaii.

Closer to home, Cleveland adopted a broad interpretation of the Monroe Doctrine that not only prohibited new European colonies, but also declared an American national interest in any matter of substance within the Western Hemisphere. When Britain and Venezuela disagreed over the boundary between Venezuela and the colony of British Guiana, Cleveland and Secretary of State Olney protested. The British initially rejected the U.S. demand for an arbitration of the boundary dispute and rejected the validity and relevance of the Monroe Doctrine. Ultimately, British Prime Minister Lord Salisbury decided that dispute over the boundary with Venezuela was not worth antagonizing the United States, and the British assented to arbitration. A tribunal convened in Paris in 1898 to decide the matter, and in 1899 awarded the bulk of the disputed territory to British Guiana. Seeking to extend arbitration to all disputes between the two countries, the United States and Britain agreed to the Olney–Pauncefote Treaty in 1897, but the treaty fell three votes short of ratification in the Senate.

The Cuban War of Independence began late in 1895 as Cuban rebels sought to break free from Spanish rule. The United States and Cuba enjoyed close trade relations, and humanitarian concerns led many Americans to demand intervention on the side of the rebels. Cleveland did not sympathize with the rebel cause and feared that an independent Cuba would ultimately fall to another European power. He issued a proclamation of neutrality in June 1895 and warned that he would stop any attempted intervention by American adventurers.

Military policy, 1893–1897
The second Cleveland administration was as committed to military modernization as the first, and ordered the first ships of a navy capable of offensive action. Construction continued on the Endicott program of coastal fortifications begun under Cleveland's first administration. The adoption of the Krag–Jørgensen rifle, the U.S. Army's first bolt-action repeating rifle, was finalized. Completion of these ships nearly doubled the Navy's battleships and created a new torpedo boat force, which previously had only two boats. However, the battleships and seven of the torpedo boats were not completed until 1899–1901, after the Spanish–American War.

Judicial appointments

Cleveland's trouble with the Senate hindered the success of his nominations to the Supreme Court in his second term. In 1893, after the death of Samuel Blatchford, Cleveland nominated William B. Hornblower to the Court. Hornblower, the head of a New York City law firm, was thought to be a qualified appointee, but his campaign against a New York machine politician had made Senator David B. Hill his enemy. Further, Cleveland had not consulted the Senators before naming his appointee, leaving many who were already opposed to Cleveland on other grounds even more aggrieved. The Senate rejected Hornblower's nomination on January 15, 1894, by a vote of 30 to 24.

Cleveland continued to defy the Senate by next nominating Wheeler Hazard Peckham, another New York attorney who had opposed Hill's machine. Hill used all of his influence to block Peckham's confirmation, and on February 16, 1894, the Senate rejected the nomination by a vote of 32 to 41. Reformers urged Cleveland to continue the fight against Hill and to nominate Frederic R. Coudert, but Cleveland acquiesced in an inoffensive choice, that of Senator Edward Douglass White of Louisiana, whose nomination was accepted unanimously. Later, in 1896, another vacancy on the Court led Cleveland to consider Hornblower again, but he declined to be nominated. Instead, Cleveland nominated Rufus Wheeler Peckham, the brother of Wheeler Hazard Peckham, and the Senate confirmed the second Peckham easily.

Election of 1896

Cleveland attempted to counteract the growing strength of the Free Silver movement, but Southern Democrats joined with their Western allies in rejecting Cleveland's economic policies. The Panic of 1893 had destroyed Cleveland's popularity, even within his own party. Though Cleveland never publicly announced that he would not seek re-election, he had no intention of running for a third term. Cleveland's silence on a potential successor was damaging to his faction of the party, as Cleveland's conservative allies were unable to unify behind one candidate. Cleveland's agrarian and silverite enemies won control of the Democratic National Convention, repudiated Cleveland's administration and the gold standard, and nominated William Jennings Bryan on a Silver Platform. Cleveland silently supported the Gold Democrats' third-party ticket that promised to defend the gold standard, limit government, and oppose high tariffs, but he declined the splinter group's offer to run for a third term.

The 1896 Republican National Convention nominated former Governor William McKinley of Ohio. With the help of campaign manager Mark Hanna, McKinley had emerged as the front-runner for the nomination long before the convention by building the support of Republican leaders throughout the country. In the general election, McKinley hoped to please both farmers and business interests by not taking a clear position on monetary issues. He focused his campaign on attacking the Cleveland administration's handling of the economy, and argued that higher tariffs would restore prosperity. Many Populist leaders wanted to nominate Eugene Debs and campaign on the party's full range of proposed reforms, but the 1896 Populist convention instead nominated Bryan. Republicans portrayed Bryan and the Populists as social revolutionaries engaged in class warfare, while Bryan attacked McKinley as a tool of the rich.

In the 1896 presidential election, McKinley won a decisive victory over Bryan, taking 51% of the popular vote and 60.6% of the electoral vote. Though Bryan had campaigned heavily in the Midwest, Democratic divisions and the traditional Republican strength in the area helped McKinley win a majority of the states in the region. McKinley also swept the Northeast, while Bryan swept the Solid South. John Palmer, the candidate of the Gold Democrats, took just under one percent of the popular vote. Despite Palmer's loss, Cleveland was pleased by the election outcome, as he strongly preferred McKinley to Bryan and saw the former's victory as vindication for the gold standard.

States admitted to the Union
During the period 1877–1888, Congress consistently rejected applications from territories in the west for statehood. Denial of statehood was largely due to a concern that the lack of a northern transcontinental railroad connection would prevent effective governance, and a hesitation to disturb the delicate balance of Democrats and Republicans in the Senate. Finally, in the closing weeks of Cleveland's first term (February 22, 1889), Congress passed a statute that enabled North Dakota, South Dakota, Montana, and Washington to draft constitutions and form state governments and to request admission to the Union. All four did, and each officially became states in November 1889, during the first year of Benjamin Harrison's administration.

Midway through his second term, July 16, 1894, the 53rd United States Congress passed an act that permitted Utah to form a constitution and state government, and to apply for statehood. On January 4, 1896, Cleveland proclaimed Utah a state on an equal footing with the other states of the Union.

Historical reputation

According to historian Henry Graff, Cleveland reasserted the power of the executive branch, but his lack of a clear vision for the country marked his presidency as pre-modern. Graff also notes that Cleveland helped establish Democratic dominance in the Solid South through policies of reconciliation while at the same time revitalizing his party in the North by embracing civil service reform. Historian Richard White describes Cleveland as the "Andrew Johnson" of the 1890s, in that Cleveland's temperament and policies were unsuited to the crisis confronting the nation. Historian Richard Welch argues that Cleveland was successful in reasserting the power of the presidency, but lacked a broad vision for the country.

Cleveland was one of the least popular public figures in the country when he left office in 1897, but his reputation had substantially recovered by the time of his death in 1908. In A Study in Courage, a 1933 biography of Cleveland historian Allan Nevins portrayed Cleveland as a courageous reformer. Historians like Henry Steele Commager and Richard Hofstadter echoed this view, with Hofstadter writing that Cleveland was "the sole reasonable facsimile of a major president between Lincoln and Theodore Roosevelt." Subsequent historians, however, emphasized Cleveland's failures and his favoritism towards big business. In a 1948 poll of historians, Cleveland was ranked as the eighth greatest president in U.S. history, but his standing in polls of historians and political scientists has declined since 1948. A 2018 poll of the American Political Science Association's Presidents and Executive Politics section ranked Cleveland as the 24th best president. A 2017 C-SPAN poll of historians ranked Cleveland as the 23rd best president.

Notes

References

Works cited

 Brodsky, Alan. Grover Cleveland: A Study in Character, (2000). 
 
 Grossman, Mark, Political Corruption in America: An Encyclopedia of Scandals, Power, and Greed (2003) 
 Jeffers, H. Paul, An Honest President: The Life and Presidencies of Grover Cleveland (2000), .
 McWilliams, Tennant S., "James H. Blount, the South, and Hawaiian Annexation." Pacific Historical Review 1988 57(1): 25–46. online.
 Nevins, Allan. Grover Cleveland: A Study in Courage (1932), a standard scholarly biography online
 Reitano, Joanne R. The Tariff Question in the Gilded Age: The Great Debate of 1888 (1994). .

 Summers, Mark Wahlgren. Rum, Romanism & Rebellion: The Making of a President, 1884 (2000). . 
 Tugwell, Rexford Guy, Grover Cleveland Simon & Schuster, Inc. (1968). short biographt online
 
 Welch, Richard E. Jr. The Presidencies of Grover Cleveland (1988)  online
 
 Zakaria, Fareed From Wealth to Power (1999) Princeton University Press. .

Further reading

 Bard, Mitchell. "Ideology and Depression Politics I: Grover Cleveland (1893–1897)" Presidential Studies Quarterly 1985 15(1): 77–88. 
 Blake, Nelson M. "Background of Cleveland's Venezuelan Policy." American Historical Review 1942 47(2): 259–277. in Jstor
 Blodgett, Geoffrey. "Ethno-cultural Realities in Presidential Patronage: Grover Cleveland's Choices" New York History 2000 81(2): 189–210. 
 Cleaver, Nick. Grover Cleveland's New Foreign Policy: Arbitration, Neutrality, and the Dawn of American Empire (Palgrave Macmillan, 2014). PhD dissertation version
 Dewey, Davis R.  National Problems: 1880–1897 (1907), online
 Doenecke, Justus. "Grover Cleveland and the Enforcement of the Civil Service Act" Hayes Historical Journal 1984 4(3): 44–58. 

 Ehrhardt, Andrew, and Charlie Laderman. "Grover Cleveland and Lord Salisbury: A Shared History." in The Palgrave Handbook of Presidents and Prime Ministers From Cleveland and Salisbury to Trump and Johnson (Palgrave Macmillan, Cham, 2022) pp. 35-56.

 Faulkner, Harold U. Politics, Reform, and Expansion, 1890–1900 (1959), online
 Ford, Henry Jones. The Cleveland Era: A Chronicle of the New Order in Politics (1921), short overview online
 Gould, Lewis. America in the Progressive Era, 1890–1914 (2001) 
 Graff, Henry F., ed. The Presidents: A Reference History (3rd ed. 2002)  online
 Grenville, John A. S. and George Berkeley Young. Politics, Strategy, and American Diplomacy: Studies in Foreign Policy, 1873-1917 (1966) pp 39–73 on "Party politics and foreign policy: Grover Cleveland's first administration, 1885-1889," and "Grover Cleveland, Richard only, and the Venezuelan crisis," pp 158–78.
 Hoffman, Karen S. "'Going Public' in the Nineteenth Century: Grover Cleveland's Repeal of the Sherman Silver Purchase Act" Rhetoric and Public Affairs 2002 5(1): 57–77. in Project MUSE
 Klinghard, Daniel P. "Grover Cleveland, William McKinley, and the emergence of the president as party leader." Presidential Studies Quarterly 35.4 (2005): 736–760.
 Lynch, G. Patrick "U.S. Presidential Elections in the Nineteenth Century: Why Culture and the Economy Both Mattered." Polity 35#1 (2002) pp. 29–50. in JSTOR, focus on election of 1884
 McElroy, Robert. Grover Cleveland, the Man and the Statesman: An Authorized Biography (1923) Vol. I, Vol. II, older narrative vol 1 and 2 online
 Merrill, Horace Samuel. Bourbon Leader: Grover Cleveland and the Democratic Party (1957) 228 pp online negative appraisal by a liberal historian
 Morgan, H. Wayne. From Hayes to McKinley: National Party Politics, 1877–1896 (1969).

 Otfinoski, Steven. Grover Cleveland (2011) for middle schools online

 Pafford, John M. The Forgotten Conservative: Rediscovering Grover Cleveland (Simon and Schuster, 2013). excerpt
 Schake, Kori. "Grover Cleveland’s Administration: Prequel to America’s Rise?" ORBIS (2017) 62(1). DOI:10.1016/j.orbis.2017.11.002. Paints Cleveland as a profound conservative.
 Stephenson, Donald Grier. "22. Grover Cleveland, First Term." in The Presidents and the Constitution, Volume One (New York University Press, 2020) pp. 288-296.
 Stephenson, Donald Grier. "24. Grover Cleveland, Second Term." in The Presidents and the Constitution, Volume One (2020) pp. 308-315.

 Walters, Ryan S. Grover Cleveland: The Last Jeffersonian President (2021) excerpt

Historiography and memory
 DeSantis, Vincent P. "Grover Cleveland: Another Look." Hayes Historical Journal 1980 3(1–2): 41–50. , argues his energy, honesty, and devotion to duty—much more than his actual accomplishments established his claim to greatness.
 Kelley, Robert, "Presbyterianism, Jacksonianism and Grover Cleveland", "American Quarterly" 1966 18(4): 615–636. online
  Marszalek, John F. Grover Cleveland : a bibliography (1988) online
 Vexler, Robert I., ed. Grover Cleveland, 1837-1908; chronology, documents, bibliographical aids (1968) online

Primary sources
 Cleveland, Grover. The writings and speeches of Grover Cleveland (1892, reprint 1970) online
 Cleveland, Grover. Letters of Grover Cleveland, 1850-1908 edited by Allan Nevins. (1933; reprinted 1970) online

External links

Letters and Speeches
 Text of a number of Cleveland's speeches at the Miller Center of Public Affairs
 Finding Aid to the Grover Cleveland Manuscripts, 1867–1908 at the New York State Library, accessed May 11, 2016
 10 letters written by Grover Cleveland in 1884–86

Media coverage
 

Other
 Grover Cleveland: A Resource Guide, Library of Congress
 Grover Cleveland: A bibliography by The Buffalo History Museum
 Grover Cleveland Sites in Buffalo, NY: A Google Map developed by The Buffalo History Museum
 Index to the Grover Cleveland Papers at the Library of Congress
 Essay on Cleveland and each member of his cabinet and First Lady, Miller Center of Public Affairs
"Life Portrait of Grover Cleveland", from C-SPAN's American Presidents: Life Portraits, August 13, 1999
 Interview with H. Paul Jeffers on An Honest President: The Life and Presidencies of Grover Cleveland, Booknotes (2000)
 
 

 
1880s in the United States
1890s in the United States
1885 establishments in the United States
1893 establishments in the United States
1889 disestablishments in the United States
1897 disestablishments in the United States
Gilded Age
Grover Cleveland
Cleveland, Grover